Opomyza florum, common name yellow cereal fly or grass fly, is a species of acalyptrate flies.

Description and ecology
Opomyza florum can reach a length of 3.5–5 mm. These small flies are rusty-yellow coloured, with several dark setae on mesonotum and scutellum. Eyes are reddish. Wings are yellowish and transparent, with some smoky-brown spots. The larval main food plants are wild cereals, leguminous and cereal crops. Larvae are oligophagous stem borer, feeding on the stems of plants. They can be found in early spring while adults fly at the end of May–June until October. This species is an agricultural pest, damaging winter cereals such as wheat, barley and rye.

Distribution
This species occurs in all of Europe.

Habitat
It can be found in meadows and fields of cereal crops.

References

 Drake, C.M. 1993. A review of the British Opomyzidae. British Journal of Entomology and Natural History 6: 159–176.
 G. P. Vickerman - Distribution and abundance of adult Opomyza florum (Diptera: Opomyzidae) in cereal crops and grassland - Annals of Applied Biology, Volume 101, Issue 3, pages 441–447, December 1982

External links

 Agroatlas
Nature spot
Commanster
Fauna Europaea

Opomyzidae
Insects described in 1794
Agricultural pest insects
Articles containing video clips
Muscomorph flies of Europe